Sybill Storz (born 1937 in Leipzig) is a businesswoman and daughter of Karl Storz.  Between 1996 and 2018 she headed Karl Storz GmbH. She was among the recipients of the Rudolf-Diesel-Medaille for 2004.

In 2013, Storz was awarded the DAS medal from the Difficult Airway Society for expanding the Storz company and registering over 100 patents in the field of airway management. She was praised for her interest in supporting the needs of physicians and for her effective development of communications and training.

Distinctions civil 
 étoile européenne du dévouement civil et militaire

References 

20th-century German businesswomen
20th-century German businesspeople
Living people
1937 births
German businesspeople in the healthcare industry
Businesspeople from Leipzig
Recipients of the Cross of the Order of Merit of the Federal Republic of Germany
Recipients of the Order of Merit of Baden-Württemberg
21st-century German businesswomen
21st-century German businesspeople